The Mallabhum Institute of Technology (MIT) is located in Bishnupur, Bankura, West Bengal, India. The college is approved by the All India Council of Technical Education (AICTE), Ministry of Human Resource Development, Government of India and Directorate of Higher Education, Government of West Bengal.

Campus
The college is situated almost at the heart of the major industrial urban complex of South West Bengal. It is at Braja Radha Nagar 6 km from Bishnupur Town, in the district of Bankura.

Transport
The nearest airport Netaji Subhas International Airport, Kolkata.
The nearest railway station is	Bishnupur, 6 km from the campus
There are rail connections from Bishnupur Railway Station to the rest of India. Express and mail trains ply between Kolkata and Bishnupur on a regular basis. The Rupashi Bangla Express, Ranchi special, Aranyak Express and the Purulia Express are the most convenient trains to reach Bishnupur from Kolkata; these trains come via Kharagpur (Midnapur) and take approx 3:00 to 3: 30hours to reach Bishnupur from Kolkata.

Road connections
 The nearest State Highway is No 2 (SH2),  from the campus
 The nearest National Highway is NH 60 (Kharagpur-Raniganj)
 Kharagpur , Durgapur , Burdwan , Arambag , Bankura , Purulia , Midnapore , IIT [KGP] , Asansol . 
 Bus services from Kolkata every half-hour from 5 am to 4 pm and up to 10 pm.  
 Frequent services available from Kolkata connecting Bishnupur, Bankura, Durgapur, Santaldih, Purulia, Jhalda, Tulin, Barasat, Barrackpore, Burdwan, Haldia, Digha, Jhargram, Chinsurah, Malda, Suri, Baharampur, Asansol, etc.

A convenient way to reach the campus is to get down from the bus at the MIT College Stop and use a rickshaw to reach campus [1 km only].
An institute bus service is available from campus to the railway station via the bus stand, four times a day. Buses, cars, autos, trekkers and rickshaws are available from the railway station & bus stand.

Organisation and administration

Board of governors
Chairperson - Sampa Banerjee
Vice Chairman - Rahul Banerjee
Member - Suchismita Banerjee (Ray)
Director - Subrata Banerjee
Principal - Manab Kumar Das

Academics

Academic programme
The following undergraduate degree programmes are offered:
Bachelor of Technology in Computer Science and Engineering (C.S.E)
Bachelor of Technology in Electronics and Communications Engineering (E.C.E)
Bachelor of Technology in Electrical Engineering (E.E)
Bachelor of Technology in Mechanical Engineering (M.E) 
Bachelor of Technology in Civil Engineering (C.E) 
The duration of all the above programs is four years. The syllabus and curriculum is structured by M.A.K.A.U.T{WBUT}.

Admission procedure
Admission to the courses happens on an annual basis. The number of seats allotted is based on the West Bengal Joint Entrance Examination (90% of the total intake) conducted by the Central Selection Committee Engineering and Technology. Through AIEEE entrance (10% of the total intake).

Annual intake
MIT has an annual intake of 360 students divided among the six branches as follows:
C.S.E: 60
E.C.E: 60
E.E : 60
M.E : 120
C.E : 60

Student life

Hostel
Separate accommodations are available for men, women, and the faculty. Each Hostel has its own dining hall. Food is served in the canteen. Indoor games, separate gymnasium, and other recreation including TV facilities and free wifi are provided. There are four boys halls of residence to provide accommodation for nearly 1,300 students at the residential campus of the institute. The ladies hostels accommodate nearly 300 ladies and the teachers' hostel accommodates almost all the faculties and laboratory assistants.

See also
List of institutions of higher education in West Bengal
Education in India
Education in West Bengal
 All India Council for Technical Education (AICTE)
 West Bengal University of Technology (WBUT)

References

External links
 Official website

Engineering colleges in West Bengal
Universities and colleges in Bankura district
Colleges affiliated to West Bengal University of Technology
Educational institutions established in 2002
2002 establishments in West Bengal